The Kansas Department of Wildlife and Parks (KDWP) is a state cabinet-level agency led by a Secretary of Wildlife and Parks appointed by the Governor of Kansas. The Office of the Secretary is located in Topeka, the state capital of Kansas.  A seven-member, bipartisan commission, also appointed by the Governor, advises the Secretary and approves regulations governing outdoor recreation and fish and wildlife resources in Kansas.  KDWP employs approximately 420 full-time employees in five divisions: Executive Services, Administrative Services, Fisheries and Wildlife, Law Enforcement, and Parks. At full staffing, KDWP Law Enforcement Division (Kansas Game Wardens) is staffed by 83 positions.

History
Fish and game laws were first organized in the state of Kansas in the form of the Kansas Fish and Game Department in 1905. In 1911, State Fish and Game Department was placed under supervision of the University of Kansas Board of Regents.  Another reorganization occurred in 1925 when the Fish and Game Department became the Kansas Forestry, Fish and Game Commission, consisting of three members appointed by the Governor. In 1978, the Forestry part was dropped from the name. The agency became known as the Kansas Fish and Game Commission. Finally in 1987, Governor Mike Hayden signed an executive order merging the State Park and Resources Authority and the Kansas Fish and Game Commission to form the Kansas Department of Wildlife and Parks. On July 1, 2011, the Division of Travel and Tourism was officially transferred from the Department of Commerce to the Kansas Department of Wildlife and Parks.  The agency then became known as the Kansas Department of Wildlife, Parks, and Tourism (KDWPT). However, Kansas Tourism was reverted back to the Department of Commerce by an executive reorganization order on July 1, 2021, which then triggered the department's name to revert to Kansas Department of Wildlife and Parks (KDWP).

Responsibilities
The Kansas Department of Wildlife and Parks (KDWP) is responsible for the following state parks:

Cedar Bluff State Park
Cheney State Park
Clinton State Park
Crawford State Park
Cross Timbers State Park
Eisenhower State Park
El Dorado State Park
Elk City State Park
Fall River State Park

Ford County State Park
Glen Elder State Park
Hillsdale State Park
Kanopolis State Park
Kaw River State Park
Lake Scott State Park
Lovewell State Park
Meade State Park
Milford State Park

Mushroom Rock State Park
Perry State Park
Pomona State Park
Prairie Dog State Park
Prairie Spirit Trail State Park
Sand Hills State Park
Tuttle Creek State Park
Webster State Park
Wilson State Park

KDWP is responsible for the following nature preserves and fishing lakes:

Atchison State Fishing Lake
Big Basin Prairie Preserve
Lake Afton

Leavenworth County State Lake
McPherson Valley Wetlands
Maxwell Wildlife Refuge

Mined Land Wildlife Area
Neosho State Fishing Lake 
Ottawa State Fishing Lake

KDWP is responsible for patrolling all counties in Kansas:

KDWP employs a number of Kansas Game Wardens (Law Enforcement Division), who are fully certified and commissioned state law enforcement officers, stationed across the state in numerous locations.  These Wardens patrol their counties enforcing state law. They specialize in fish/game and boating law enforcement but also routinely deal with other violations that they may encounter. They have full authority to enforce all state statutes and have statewide jurisdiction. Many times KDWPT Game Wardens work with other law enforcement agencies such as the Kansas Highway Patrol and local sheriff or police departments.

Game Wardens are usually issued the .45 Auto Glock 21 as the sidearm of choice for the agency. As of 2022, Game Wardens are using the Glock Model 21 Gen 4 .45 Auto sidearm. In 2010, the department began issuing the Wardens AR-15 patrol rifles manufactured by Stag Arms, in .223 caliber.  Prior to 2010, they were issued military loan/leased M-14 rifles in .308 caliber.

Controversy and newsworthy events

In 2004, A Kansas Game Warden shot a suspect during a police hunt. KBI agent Bruce Mellor said the incident began when officers with the Goodland Police Department and the Sherman County Sheriff's Office tried to apprehend two men. Officers called a Kansas Wildlife and Parks Officer for help during the altercation. One of the men was shot by a Kansas Game Warden after he reportedly approached the Game Warden with a knife.   

The Kansas Department of Wildlife and Parks made international headlines when game warden Tanner Dixson shot an illegally kept pet deer five times and killed it in front of the family who had cared for it for the past 22 months. Taryn Mcgaughey, who cared for Faline the deer with her parents, Mark and Kim Mcgaughey, filmed the incident. The video of the deer being slaughtered by Dixson outraged people around the world and resulted in petitions demanding that Tanner Dixson be terminated. However, the Kansas Department of Wildlife and Parks took no action against Tanner Dixson.  KDWP does not recommend breaking the law; doing such will prevent situations like this from happening.

In February 2017, the Kansas Department of Wildlife and Parks made national headlines when Game Warden Lynn Koch fired his .45 caliber handgun at the antlers of two buck deer that were entangled together by their antlers to successfully free them. Both deer were saved and this lifesaving action was videoed on a body camera worn by Warden Koch. The video was shared by numerous social media and news outlets.

In June 2017, Kansas Game Wardens rescued a woman who flipped her Kayak at Perry Lake. This rescue made state headlines after the bodycamera video of the incident surfaced on a number of media sources. 

On August 30, 2017, the Kansas Department of Wildlife and Parks deployed a fourteen-man team of Game Wardens to Texas to assist with water rescues after hurricane Harvey struck the state.  The wardens were equipped with a mobile command trailer and seven boats. Several successful voluntary evacuations were conducted during the deployment.

In February 2019, Several Kansas Game Wardens were dispatched to a rural pond in McPherson County after a call came in that deer were stuck on the pond and had fallen through the ice. Wardens used specialized equipment to rescue a deer from the ice, although it appeared that several other deer may have broken through the ice and perished. 

In May 2019, Game Wardens from the Kansas Department of Wildlife and Parks deployed an airboat to rescue a rural Neosho Rapids family stranded by floodwater.  The airboat made two trips, evacuating a total of four people. Each trip took about 18 minutes round-trip. No injuries were reported. 

In January 2021, Kansas Game Wardens once again made national news by successfully freeing two buck deer by shooting their antlers. The bodycamera video was shown on numerous media sites.

See also
List of law enforcement agencies in Kansas
List of State Fish and Wildlife Management Agencies in the U.S.

References

External links
Official Website
Kansas Department of Wildlife and Parks publications online at the KGI Online Library

State agencies of Kansas
State parks of Kansas
1987 establishments in Kansas
State wildlife and natural resource agencies of the United States
Government agencies established in 1987